Millionaire: The Stock Market Simulation is a 1982 video game published by Blue Chip Software.

Gameplay
The player goes through 77 weeks and can buy and sell fifteen different stocks available from five industry groups.

Reception
Johnny L. Wilson reviewed the game for Computer Gaming World, and stated that "Millionaire is a stimulating experience for anyone who enjoys the strategic decisions inherent in high finance."

Electronic Games awarded Millionaire the 1985 Arkie Awards for "Best Electronic Money Game".

References

External links
Review in Compute!
Review in Softalk
1984 Software Encyclopedia from Electronic Games
Review in Antic
Article in Computer Games
Article in MacUser
Review in MacWorld
Article in Family Computing
Review in Electronic Games
Review in Peelings
Review in PC Magazine

1982 video games
Apple II games
Atari 8-bit family games
Business simulation games
Classic Mac OS games
Commodore 64 games
DOS games
Video games developed in the United States